Artyom Alexandrovich Arefyev (born 17 June 1984) is a Paralympian athlete from Russia competing mainly in category T36 sprint events.

He competed in the 2004 Summer Paralympics in Athens, Greece. There he won a gold medal in the men's 400 metres - T36 event, and a gold medal in the men's 1500 metres - T36 event. He also competed at the 2008 Summer Paralympics in Beijing, China. There he won a gold medal in the men's 800 metres - T36 event, and a silver medal in the men's 400 metres - T36 event.

Notes

External links 
 

Paralympic athletes of Russia
Athletes (track and field) at the 2004 Summer Paralympics
Athletes (track and field) at the 2008 Summer Paralympics
Paralympic gold medalists for Russia
Paralympic silver medalists for Russia
Living people
1984 births
Athletes (track and field) at the 2012 Summer Paralympics
Medalists at the 2004 Summer Paralympics
Medalists at the 2008 Summer Paralympics
Medalists at the 2012 Summer Paralympics
Paralympic medalists in athletics (track and field)
21st-century Russian people